Else Brökelschen (25 June 1890 in Barmen – 22 October 1976 in Goslar) was a German politician of the Christian Democratic Union (CDU) and former member of the German Bundestag.

Life 
In 1945 she and others founded the CDU in Goslar and represented the party in the city council there from 1946 to 1950. After that, she was a member of the German Bundestag from the first federal election in 1949 to 1961, where she was always elected to the party's Lower Saxony state list.

Literature

References

1890 births
1976 deaths
Members of the Bundestag for Lower Saxony
Members of the Bundestag 1957–1961
Members of the Bundestag 1953–1957
Members of the Bundestag 1949–1953
Female members of the Bundestag
20th-century German women politicians
Members of the Bundestag for the Christian Democratic Union of Germany
Politicians from Wuppertal